The 2013–14 Primera B de Chile season was the 64th completed season of the Primera B de Chile.

Torneo Apertura

San Luis de Quillota was tournament’s champion.

Torneo Clausura

San Marcos de Arica was tournament’s champion.

References

External links
 RSSSF 2013

Primera B de Chile seasons
Primera B